Unorganised Workers' Social Security Act 2008 was an Act of the Parliament of India enacted to provide for the social security and welfare of the unorganised workers(meaning home-based workers, self-employed workers or daily-wage workers). This act received the assent of the President of India on 30 December 2008. It is replaced by The Code on Social Security, 2020.

Contents
The act provides for the constitution of National Social Security Board at the Central level which shall recommend formulation of social security schemes viz life and disability cover, health and maternity benefits, old age protection and any other benefit as may be determined by the Government for unorganised workers. As a follow up to the implementation of the Act, the National Social Security Board was set up on 18 August 2009.

See also
Indian labour law
UK labour law
US labor law
German labour law
European labour law
 Unorganised Workers' Identification Number

Notes

External links
Text of the Act from the ILO

Acts of the Parliament of India 2008
Indian labour law
2008 in labor relations